This article is about División de Honor de Beisbol 2008, the 2008 was the 65th edition, the season started on 29 March and finished on 10 August 2008. The División de Honor champion was Marlins de Puerto Cruz and the Copa del Rey champion was El Llano Béisbol Club.

Final standings

Copa del Rey 2008

External links
División de Honor de Beisbol 2008 at RFEBS
Copa del Rey official statistics

División de Honor de Béisbol